Kim Clijsters was the defending champion, but did not compete this year due to a wrist injury.

Amélie Mauresmo, who was the runner-up last year, won the title by defeating Jennifer Capriati 3–6, 6–3, 7–6(8–6) in the final. It was the 2nd title of the year for Mauresmo and the 12th of her career.

Seeds
The first eight seeds received a bye into the second round.

Draw

Finals

Top half

Section 1

Section 2

Bottom half

Section 3

Section 4

External links
 Main and Qualifying draws

Women's Singles
Italian Open - Singles